Héctor Martín Icart Atahídes (born 1 December 1984 in Montevideo) is a retired Uruguayan footballer.

External links
 
 Player profile 

1984 births
Living people
Uruguayan footballers
Uruguayan expatriate footballers
Association football midfielders
C.A. Bella Vista players
Danubio F.C. players
Rampla Juniors players
Club Atlético River Plate (Montevideo) players
Juventud de Las Piedras players
Cienciano footballers
La Equidad footballers
Patriotas Boyacá footballers
Universidad Técnica de Cajamarca footballers
Puerto Montt footballers
Central Español players
Sud América players
Uruguayan Primera División players
Primera B de Chile players
Categoría Primera A players
Peruvian Primera División players
Uruguayan expatriate sportspeople in Chile
Uruguayan expatriate sportspeople in Colombia
Uruguayan expatriate sportspeople in Peru
Expatriate footballers in Chile
Expatriate footballers in Colombia
Expatriate footballers in Peru